Abuja is the capital and eighth most populous city of Nigeria. Situated at the centre of the country within the Federal Capital Territory (FCT), it is a planned city built mainly in the 1980s based on a master plan by International Planning Associates (IPA), a consortium of three American planning and architecture firms made up of Wallace, Roberts, McHarg & Todd (WRMT – a group of architects) as the lead, Archisystems International (a subsidiary of the Howard Hughes Corporation), and Planning Research Corporation. The Central Business District of Abuja was designed by Japanese architect Kenzo Tange. It replaced Lagos, the country's most populous city, as the capital on 12 December 1991.

Abuja's geography is defined by Aso Rock, a  monolith left by water erosion. The Presidential Complex, National Assembly, Supreme Court and much of the city extend to the south of the rock. Zuma Rock, a  monolith, lies just north of the city on the expressway to Kaduna.

At the 2006 census, the city of Abuja had a population of 776,298 and 179,674 households making it one of the ten most populous cities in Nigeria (placing eighth as of 2006). According to the United Nations, Abuja grew by 139.7% between 2000 and 2010, making it the fastest growing city in the world.
, the city is experiencing an annual growth of at least 35%, retaining its position as the fastest-growing city on the African continent and one of the fastest-growing in the world. As of 2016, the metropolitan area of Abuja is estimated at six million people, placing it behind only Lagos as the most populous metro area in Nigeria.

Major religious sites include the Nigerian National Mosque and the Nigerian National Christian Centre. The city is served by the Nnamdi Azikiwe International Airport. Abuja is known for being one of the few purpose-built capital cities in Africa, as well as being one of the wealthiest.

Abuja is Nigeria's administrative and political capital. It is also a key capital on the African continent due to Nigeria's geo-political influence in regional affairs. Abuja is also a conference centre and hosts various meetings annually, such as the 2003 Commonwealth Heads of Government meeting and the 2014 World Economic Forum (Africa) meetings. Abuja joined the UNESCO Global Network of Learning Cities in 2016.

History 

"Abuja" was in the earlier 20th century the name of the nearby town now called Suleja.

The indigenous inhabitants of Abuja are the Gbagyi (Gwari), with the Gbagyi language formerly being the major language of the region. Other groups in the area include the Bassa, Gwandara, Gade, Dibo, Egburra, Nupe and Koro. In light of the ethnic and religious divisions of Nigeria, plans had been devised since Nigeria's independence to have its capital in a place deemed neutral to all major ethnic parties, and also in close proximity to all the regions of Nigeria. The location was eventually designated in the centre of the country in the early 1970s as it signified neutrality and national unity. Another impetus for Abuja came because of Lagos' population boom that made that city overcrowded and conditions squalid. As Lagos was already undergoing rapid economic development, the Nigerian regime felt the need to expand the economy towards the inner part of the country, and hence decided to move its capital to Abuja. The logic used was similar to the way Brazil planned its capital, Brasília.

The Federal Military Government of Nigeria, promulgated decree No. 6 on 4 February 1976, which initiated the removal of the Federal Capital from Lagos to Abuja. The initial work for Abuja's planning and implementation were carried out by the Military Government of General's Murtala Mohammed and Olusegun Obasanjo. However, the foundation of Abuja was under the Administration of Shehu Shagari in 1979. Construction started in  1979 but, due to economic and political instability, the initial stages of the city were not complete until the late 1980s.

The move of Nigeria's Capital to Abuja was controversial, and the biggest opposition to it was led by Obafemi Awolowo. Awolowo, as a politician and a representative of the Yoruba people, defended their claims against the move of the Capital from Lagos. During the hotly-contested campaign for the presidency, he vowed to hire the American Walt Disney Corporation to convert the new site (Abuja) into an amusement park if he was elected. However, after his election as president, Alhaji Shehu Shagari laid the first foundation for Abuja's infrastructure and pushed for its early completion. His first journey outside of Lagos after his election was to Abuja, where he visited contractors and workers on site to urge a speedy completion of the project. On his return, he confided in Alhaji Abubakar Koko his disappointment with the slow progress of work. Shehu Shagari rescheduled the planned relocation to Abuja from 1986 to 1982 which later proved difficult.

The International Planning Associates (IPA) was commissioned in June 1977, by the Federal Capital Development Authority (FCDA) to produce the Abuja Master Plan and its regional grid. According to the terms of reference, the master planning process was to include a review of relevant data, selection of a capital city site, preparation of regional and city plans and the accompanying design and development standards manual.

IPA did not exist prior to the Nigerian Government's engagement for an internationally reputable firm to design the master plan. IPA was formed by a consortium of three American firms which won the worldwide competitive bidding. The firms were Planning Research Corporation (PRC), Wallace, McHarg, Roberts and Todd, and Archisystems (a division of the Hughes Organisation). After winning the bid, and completing the project, the firms were disbanded.

The final report was submitted to the pioneer Executive Secretary of FCDA, Alhaji Abubakar Koko, on 15 February 1979. In the preface to the master plan, the following declaration was made by IPA:

The master plan for Abuja defined the general structure and major design elements of the city that are now visible. More detailed design of the central areas of the capital, particularly its monumental core, was accomplished by Japanese architect Kenzo Tange, with his team of city planners at Kenzo Tange and Urtec company. Most countries relocated their embassies to Abuja, and many maintain their former embassies as consulates in Lagos, the commercial capital of Nigeria. Abuja is the headquarters of the Economic Community of West African States (ECOWAS) and the regional headquarters of OPEC. Abuja and the FCT have experienced huge population growth; it has been reported that some areas around Abuja have been growing at 20% to 30% per year. Squatter settlements and towns have spread rapidly in and outside the city limits. Tens of thousands of people have been evicted since former FCT minister Nasir Ahmad el-Rufai started a demolition campaign in 2003.

Administration 
Abuja city is run by the Abuja Municipal Area Council. In addition to the civic administration the city is the location for the federal government of Nigeria, and likewise the Federal Capital Territory Administration which is responsible for the encompassing Federal Capital Territory.

Abuja Municipal Area Council 
The Abuja Municipal Area Council is the local government responsible for administration of the city. Councillorship and chairmanship elections are held regularly. The People's Democratic Party won the 2013 election, as it had in 2010. The Abuja Municipal Area Council is located in the eastern wing of the Federal Capital Territory of Nigeria.

Federal Capital Territory Administration 
The Federal Capital Territory is headed by the Federal Capital Territory Minister, Malam Muhammad Bello, who is appointed by the central government. The Federal Capital Territory Minister appoints members to the Abuja Metropolitan Management Council.

The Federal Capital Territory's ministers have been as follows:
Mobolaji Ajose-Adeogun 1976–1979
John Jatau Kadiya, 1979–1982
Iro Abubakar Dan Musa, 1982–1983
Haliru Dantoro, 1983–1984
Mamman Jiya Vatsa, 1984 – December 1985
Hamza Abdullahi, 1986–1989
Gado Nasko, 1989–1993
Jeremiah Timbut Useni, 1993–1998
Mamman Kontagora, 1998–1999
Ibrahim Bunu, 1999–2001
Mohammed Abba Gana, 2001–2003
Nasir Ahmad el-Rufai, 2003 – May 2007
Aliyu Modibo, 2007–2008
Adamu Aliero, 2008–2010
Bala Abdulkadir Mohammed, 2010–2015
Mohammed Bello, 2015–present

Phases 

For ease and co-ordination of developmental efforts, the city was divided into 'Phases' by its planners, with the city's development taking a concentric form with Phase 1, which consists of the city's inner districts-Central Area, Maitama, Asokoro, Wuse, Wuse II, Garki, Garki II, Guzape and Guzape II-at its core spreading out from the foot of Aso Rock, while Phase 5, consisting of the newly created Kyami District covering the vicinity of the Nnamdi Azikiwe International Airport and the permanent campus of the University of Abuja, over 40 kilometres west of Aso Rock. Each Phase is separated from the other by an expressway (some still under construction); for example, Phases 1 and 2 are separated from each other by the Nnamdi Azikiwe expressway, while the entirety of the city proper (Phases 1–5) are enclosed by the Murtala Muhammed (Outer Northern-ONEX and Outer Southern-OSEX) expressways as well as the Federal A2 highway which traverses the Federal Capital Territory on its way to Kaduna (north-bound) and Lokoja (south-bound). Thus there is an integration of the city's road network with the Federal highway network, providing access to the immediate outlying countryside and the surrounding states of the country i.e. Niger State to the west, Kaduna State to the north, Nasarawa State to the east and Kogi State to the south.

The Phase 1 area of the city is divided into ten districts known as cadastral zones.
 Central Cadastral Zone A00
 Garki I District Cadastral Zone A01
 Wuse 1 District Cadastral Zone A02
 Garki II District Cadastral Zone A03
 Asokoro Cadastral Zone A04
 Maitama District Cadastral Zone A05 & A06
 Wuse II Districts (Cadastral Zone A07 & Cadastral Zone A08)
 Guzape District Cadastral Zone A09
 Maitama II District Cadastral Zone A10

There are also sixteen districts in Phase 2.
 Kukwuaba Cadastral Zone B00
 Gudu Cadastral Zone B01
Durumi Cadastral Zone B02
 Wuye Cadastral Zone B03
 Jabi Cadastral Zone B04
 Utako Cadastral Zone B05
 Mabuchi Cadastral Zone B06
 Jahi Cadastral Zone B08
 Kado Cadastral Zone B09
 Dakibiyu Cadastral Zone B10
 Kaura Cadastral Zone B11
 Duboyi Cadastral Zone B12
 Gaduwa Cadastral Zone B13
 Dutse Cadastral Zone B14
 Katampe Ext Cadastral Zone B19

There are eleven districts in Phase 3.
 Institution and Research Cadastral Zone C00
 Karmo Cadastral Zone C01
 Gwarimpa Cadastral Zone C02
 Dape Cadastral Zone C04
 Kafe Cadastral Zone C05
 Nbora Cadastral Zone C06
 Galadimawa Cadastral Zone C07
 Dakwo Cadastral Zone C08
 Lokogoma Cadastral Zone C09
 Wumba Cadastral Zone C10
 Idu Industrial Cadastral Zone C16

There are five suburban districts: Nyanya, Karu, Gwagwalada, Kubwa, and Jukwoyi. Along the Airport Road (Now Umaru Musa Yar'Adua Express Way) are clusters of satellite settlements, namely Lugbe, Chika, Kuchigworo and Pyakassa. Other satellite settlements are Idu (the main industrial zone), Mpape, Karimu, Gwagwa, Dei-Dei (housing the International Livestock market and also International Building materials market).

Cityscape 

The Abuja skyline is made up of mostly mid-range and a few tall buildings. Only recently have tall buildings begun to appear. Most of the buildings are modern, reflecting that it is a new city.

Plans were made to build skyscrapers such as the Millennium Tower which is partly completed as work has stalled for the last few years. The tower is part of a huge cultural development complex called the Nigeria National Complex including the Nigeria Cultural Centre, a  structure dedicated to the art and culture of Nigeria. The Cultural Centre and the Millennium Tower have been designed by the Italian architect Manfredi Nicoletti.

Landmarks include the Millennium Tower, the Central Bank of Nigeria headquarters, the Nigerian Presidential Complex, the Ship House, the National Stadium, which was the main venue of the 2003 All Africa Games and some games, including the final, of the 2009 FIFA Under-17 World Cup, National Mosque, the National Church, Aso Rock and Zuma Rock.

Parks and open areas 

Abuja is home to several parks and green areas with the largest one being Millennium Park. Millennium Park was designed by architect Manfredi Nicoletti and was officially opened by the United Kingdom's Queen Elizabeth II (the former Queen of Nigeria) in December 2003. Another open area park is located in Lifecamp Gwarimpa; near the residence of the Minister of the Federal Capital Territory. The park is located on a slightly raised hilltop which contains sports facilities like Basketball and Badminton courts another park is the city park, it is located in wuse 2 and is home to numerous outdoor and indoor attractions such as a 4D cinema, Astro-turf, lawn tennis court, paintball arena and a variety of restaurants. The National Children's Park and Zoo host a number of animals, and recreation spots.

Bush Bars 
Abuja has a variety of informal spaces known as "Bush Bars" that usually, though not always, include a covered area with tables and chairs where people can sit and have drinks (alcoholic and non-alcoholic) and sometimes there are snacks such as suya, grilled catfish, pounded yam, egusi soup and other small items available for purchase. They are located all over Abuja.

Central Business District 
Abuja's Central District, also called Central Area, is a strip of land stretching from Aso Rock in the east to the National Stadium and the Old City gate in the West. It is like the city's spinal cord, dividing it into the northern sector with Maitama and Wuse, and the southern sector with Garki and Asokoro. While each district has its own clearly demarcated commercial and residential sectors, the Central District is the city's principal Business Zone, where practically all parastatals and multinational corporations have their offices. An attractive area in the Central District is the region known as the Three Arms Zone, so-called because it houses the administrative offices of the executive, legislative and judicial arms of the federal government. A few of the other sites worth seeing in the area are the federal secretariats alongside Shehu Shagari Way, Aso Hill, the Abuja Plant Nursery, Eagle Square (which has important historic significance, as it was in this grounds that the present democratic dispensation had its origin on 29 May 1999) and in which all subsequent Presidential Inauguration ceremonies have taken place. The Tomb of the Unknown Soldier is situated across Shehu Shagari Way facing Eagle Square. This section is usually closed to traffic during the annual Armed Forces Remembrance Day ceremonies that is observed on 15 January. The National Mosque and National Church of Nigeria are opposite each other on either side of Independence Avenue. A well-known government office is the Ministry of Defense, colloquially nicknamed "Ship House". Also located here is the yet-to-be-completed National Square, Millennium tower and Nigeria Cultural Centre multi-functional complex.

Garki District 

The Garki District is the area in the southwest corner of the city, having the Central District to the north and the Asokoro District to the east. The district is subdivided into units called "Areas". Garki uses a distinctive naming convention of "Area" to refer to parts of Garki. These are designated as Areas 1 to 11. Garki II is used to differentiate the area from Garki Area 2. Visitors may find this system confusing.

Garki is presently the principal business and administrative district of Abuja. Numerous buildings of interest are in this area. Some of them include the General Post Office, Abuja International Conference Centre along the busy Herbert Macaulay Way, Nicon Luxury Hotel (formally known as Abuja Sofitel Hotel and Le Meridian), Agura Hotel and Old Federal Secretariat Complex Buildings (Area 1). A new five-star hotel, Hawthorn Suites Abuja, is in Garki.

Area 2 is mainly used for residential purposes, although a zoological garden, as well as a small shopping centre, are to be found here as well. Several banks and other commercial offices are located along Moshood Abiola Way in Area 7. The headquarters of the Nigerian Armed Forces – Army, Airforce and Navy – is located on Muhammadu Buhari Way in the Garki District.

The tallest building in this district is the Radio House located at the Area 11 sector, which houses the Federal Ministry of Information and Communications, the Federal Radio Corporation of Nigeria (FRCN) and Voice of Nigeria (VON). The Nigerian Television Authority (NTA) stations and corporate headquarters are also in Garki. The Federal Capital Development Authority (FCDA) which oversees and runs the Administration of the Federal Capital Territory has its offices in Garki.

The Office of the Minister of the Federal Capital Territory is in Area 11. This is the location of the Federal Capital Development Authority and other administrative buildings. A popular sub-neighborhood here is found in the vicinity of Gimbiya street, because it has the unique characteristic of being a purely administrative zone on weekdays, while transforming purely into an entertainment zone on weeknights and weekends.

Other places of note include the Cyprian Ekwensi Arts & Culture Centre and The Nigerian Police Mobile Force CID (Criminal Investigation Department) headquarters in Area 10. The Abuja Municipal Area Council, which is the local government administration has its headquarters in Area 10. The new United States Embassy is in the Diplomatic Zone which adjoins Garki.

Wuse District 

Wuse District is the northwestern part of the city, with the Maitama District to its north and the Central District to its south. The District is numbered Zones 1–6. The Wuse Market is Abuja's principal market. The second most important post office in the city is here. This district houses the Sheraton Hotel and Towers (Zone 4), Grand Ibro International hotel, the Federal Road Safety Corps Headquarters (Zone 3), Nigerian Customs Services Headquarters, Federal Civil Service Commission (Zone 3), National Agency for Food and Drugs Administration (NAFDAC) (Zone 7), Wuse General Hospital, and the Nigerian Tourism Development Corporation,Spice Platter and Thought Pyramid Art Centre. Just as Garki District has Garki II, Wuse has Wuse II. This is distinct from Wuse Zone 2.Wuse 2 houses some of Nigeria's highly luxurious properties. Like other inner Abuja districts such as Asokoro or Garki there are very few large housing estates, instead, office buildings, mansions and apartment blocks are prominent features of the area.The district enjoys first-rate transport links to all parts of the city. Major roads include Ahmadu Bello Way, Herbert Macaulay Way, Olusegun Obasanjo Way and Nnamdi Azikiwe Expressway.

Given its good infrastructure, excellent location in the heart of Abuja and the abundant social activities available, the Wuse area is a very well-liked place to live in. As a result, property prices here are some of the highest in the country.

Maitama District 

Maitama District is to the north of the city, with the Wuse and Central Districts lying to its southwest and southeast respectively. This area is home to the top bracket sections of society and business, and has the reputation of being very exclusive and very expensive. Interesting buildings include the Transcorp Hilton Abuja, Nigerian Communications Commission Headquarters (NCC), National Universities Commission (NUC), Soil Conservation Complex, and Independent National Electoral Commission (INEC). The British High Commission is located along Aguiyi Ironsi Way, in Maitama. Also, the Maitama District Hospital is another notable building in Maitama. Maitama District is home to many of the European and Asian embassies.

Maitama II District 
Maitama II District Cadastral Zone A10 is a new district created by the FCT administration of Muhammed Bello in 2018. Maitama 2 as it is unofficially called was created from Mpape hills, a suburb bothering Bwari and Maitama Districts of the FCT. Maitama II has a high net worth of individuals especially legislators as allottees, which makes it a destination for real estate investors who desire to secure the future today.

It is not very clear what the government plans for the district as not much has been said by government agents, but cadastral zoning A indicates the government has good plans for Maitama 2 to correct some errors in Maitama District.

It was learned that plots of land were revoked from allottees of Mpape district to create the new Maitama II District, although a compensation plan is underway to relocate the revoked allottees to another district the government intends to create. Fortunately, some developers of the Mpape district who have building plan approval and have started building maintain their plots and allocations and are covered in the Maitama II District layout. It is not clear though if a fresh allocation bearing Maitama II District has been issued to this set of allottees.

Notable landmarks of the Maitama 2 district are Jubilation Avenue, Mount Pleasant Haven and Hilltop Estate.

The district infrastructure is in top gear as the Federal Government had in the 2018 and 2019 budgets allocated about N1.3b for the engineering design of the district. Villages around the district are leaving in fear of demolition at any time with the information reaching them that government will commence the infrastructure project of Maitama II District.

Asokoro District 

Asokoro District, the doyen of the districts, houses all of the state's lodges/guesthouses. The ECOWAS secretariat is a focal point of interest. Asokoro is to the east of Garki District and south of Central District. It is one of the most exclusive districts of Abuja and houses virtually all of the federal cabinet ministers as well as most of the diplomatic community in the city; in addition, the Presidential Palace (commonly referred to as the Aso Rock) is in Asokoro District. By virtue of this fact, Asokoro is the most secure area of the city.

Jabi District 
Jabi is a developed district in phase 2 of Abuja. It is both residential and commercial in nature. The residential parts of the district are peaceful with streets of large gated houses being a prominent feature. The more commercial parts of the area are significantly busier. The district plays host to the Jabi Lake, which sits by the Jabi Lake Mall.

Gwarimpa District 

Gwarimpa is the last district in the Abuja Municipal Area Council. It is a  drive from the central district and contains the largest single housing estate in Nigeria, the Gwarimpa Housing Estate. The estate was built by the administration of General Sani Abacha and is the largest of its kind in Africa. It provides residence for the majority of the civil servants in federal ministries and government parastatals. The ECOWAS Court has an official quarter for the President and Members of the Court in Gwarimpa.

Durumi District 
Durumi District is located southwest of Abuja and is bordered by Garki Districts I and II to the northeast. Its borders are the Oladipo Diya Road to the southwest, the Nnamdi Azikiwe Express Way to the northeast, and Ahmadu Bello Way to the southeast.

The American International School of Abuja is located in the Durumi District.

Apo District 
It receives one of the best power supplies in the whole of Abuja.

Geography 

Climate 
Abuja under Köppen climate classification features a tropical wet and dry climate (Köppen: Aw). The FCT experiences three weather conditions annually. This includes a warm, humid rainy season and a blistering dry season. In between the two, there is a brief interlude of harmattan occasioned by the northeast trade wind, with the main feature of dust haze and cloudless skies.

Even the coolest nights can be followed by daytime temperatures well above . The medium altitude and undulating terrain of the FCT act as a moderating influence on the weather of the territory. The city's inland location causes the diurnal temperature variation to be much larger than coastal cities with similar climates such as Lagos.

Rainfall in the FCT reflects the territory's location on the windward side of the Jos Plateau and the zone of rising air masses with the city receiving frequent rainfall during the rainy season from April to October every year.

The effects of climate change have been observed in Abuja, according to a study conducted by the Nigerian Meteorological Agency and Atmospheric Science Group of Imo State University. Between 1993 and 2013, the average maximum temperature trended downward, but the average minimum and mean temperatures trended upwards. There was a downward trend for rainfall in Abuja, based on data collected between 1986 and 2016. The drought occurrence probability for Abuja increased by 15.4% between 1975 and 2014.

Environmental impact reduction

Vegetation 

The FCT falls within the Guinean forest-savanna mosaic zone of the West African sub-region. Patches of rain forest, however, occur in the Gwagwa plains, especially in the rugged terrain to the southeastern parts of the territory, where a landscape of gullies and rough terrain is found. These areas of the Federal Capital Territory (FCT) form one of the few surviving occurrences of the mature forest vegetation in Nigeria.

Gallery

Demographics 
At the 2006 census, the city of Abuja had a population of 776,298, making it then the eighth most populous city in Nigeria. United Nations figures showed that Abuja grew by 139.7% between 2000 and 2010, making it the fastest growing city in the world. , the city is experiencing an annual growth of at least 35%, retaining its position as the fastest-growing city on the African continent and one of the fastest-growing in the world.

Conurbation 
Abuja has witnessed a huge influx of people into the city; the growth has led to the emergence of satellite towns, such as Karu Urban Area, Suleja, Gwagwalada, Lugbe, Kuje and smaller settlements towards which the planned city is sprawling. The urban agglomeration centred upon Abuja had a population estimated at 3,770,000 in 2022. The metropolitan area of Abuja was estimated in 2016 at six million people, the country's second-most populous metro area. The city has a large and growing immigrant community consisting mainly of nationals from the ECOWAS sub-region. The city has been undergoing a rapid pace of physical development over the last fifteen years.

Economy and infrastructure

Real estate 
Real estate is a major driver of the Abuja economy. This correlates with the considerable growth and investment the city has seen as it has developed. The sources of this investment have been both foreign and local. The real estate sector continues to have a positive impact on the city, as it is a major avenue for employment.

Postal system 
Abuja is served by the Nigerian Postal Service which maintains postal codes, street names and zones.

Transportation

Airport 

Nnamdi Azikiwe International Airport is the main airport serving Abuja and the surrounding capital region. It was named after Nigeria's first president, Nnamdi Azikiwe. The airport has international and domestic terminals.

Highways 
Abuja is also linked to Nasarawa, Plateau, Benue and Northeast Nigeria by the A234 Federal Highway, which starts from the city as the Goodluck Jonathan expressway, some portions of which are still under construction. A direct highway link to Minna in Niger State is still under construction. The A2 expressway links Abuja with Kaduna in the north and Lokoja in the south. There are also other highway links with the outlying region, such as that linking the suburb of Dutse Alhaji with the Lower Usuma and Gurara Dams, which supply water to the city.

Rail 

Abuja is on the route of the planned Lagos–Kano Standard Gauge Railway, which has been completed between Abuja and Kaduna. Trains for Kaduna depart from the Idu Railway Station in Abuja. There is a car park at the train station for passengers traveling to the city centre. Abuja light rail system serves city's centre, Idu industrial neighbourhood and airport, opened in 2018 and became the first rapid transit in the country and in Western Africa.

Education 
Abuja is also known as one of the states in Nigeria that provides quality post-secondary education. It's speedily becoming an attraction for students due to the growing presence of both public and private universities.

Universities 
 African University of Science and Technology
 Baze University
 National Open University of Nigeria
 Nile University of Nigeria
 University of Abuja
 Veritas University
 Philomath University

International schools 
 The Centagon International School, Maitama
 American International School of Abuja
 Whiteplains British School, Jabi
 École Française Marcel Pagnol
 Abraham Lincoln American Academy, Abuja

Natural resources 
Abuja is one of the cities that are endowed with natural resources in Nigeria, and these resources serve as raw materials for pharmaceutical, food processing, medicinal and other processing companies, and they are also useful for commercial purposes, and as sources of food. Among these materials include:

Mineral Raw Materials 

 Clay
 Gold
 Tin
 Feldspar
 Tantalite
 Cassiterite
 Marble
 Talc
 Dolomite

Agro Raw Materials 

 Maize
 Groundnut
 Sorghum

Honorary citizens 
People awarded the Honorary citizenship of Abuja are:

See also 
Centenary City

References

External links 

 Official website

 
1970s establishments in Nigeria
Capitals in Africa
Cities in Nigeria
Federal Capital Territory (Nigeria)
Local Government Areas in the Federal Capital Territory (Nigeria)
New towns started in the 1970s
Planned capitals
Planned cities in Nigeria
Populated places established in the 1970s
Populated places in the Federal Capital Territory (Nigeria)